The Lords of Padua ruled the city from 1308 until 1405. The commune of Padua became a hereditary one-man lordship with the election of Jacopo I da Carrara as capitano del popolo in 1308. His descendants, the Carraresi, ruled the city and its vicinity, with short interruptions, until they were defeated by the Republic of Venice in the War of Padua, which resulted in the annexation of the city by Venice.

See also
 Timeline of Padua

Sources
 

 
Padua, Lords of
Da Carrara family